Mundillo is a craft of handmade bobbin lace that is cultivated and honored on the island of Puerto Rico and Panama. The term 'mundillo' means 'little world', referring to the cylindrical pillow on which the lace maker ('Mundillista') weaves intricate designs. The decorative lace is created using wooden bobbins about the diameter of a pencil, which are wound with thread that is twisted and crossed to form a pattern. Depending on the pattern, as few as two dozen or as many as several hundred bobbins may be used.

In addition to its use as edging and borders on tablecloths and handkerchiefs, and for traditional shirt collars and trim, mundillo is also used to decorate items for special occasions, such as wedding dresses, baptismal gowns, and the cloths used to adorn religious icons. It is said that it was once common for lovers to exchange mundillo lace with romantic inscriptions.

Bobbin lace was brought to Puerto Rico from Spain, where it had thrived in major commercial markets as well as a cottage industry in Galicia, Castilla, and Catalonia. In Spain, lace is called encaje, because it was worked on separately and then joined to material (the Spanish word for "join" is encajar).  

In the 20th century, lacemaking became an important economic activity by women of the island. Prior to WWII, lace provided income for many families to supplement the wages of men who had traveled off-island for work. A revival of the tradition in the 1960s and 1970s engaged a new generation of lacemakers. In the 1990s, it was reported that 300 people were practitioners of mundillo on the island of Puerto Rico. 

In Moca, commonly known as the Capital or cradle of Mundillo, there is an annual festival dedicated to the handmade lace as well as a museum, El Museo Del Mundillo.

Mundillo is celebrated and featured in festivals around the island. A workshop with kits to help train newcomers to mundillo was offered in Morovis in 2018.

In 2021, 95-year-old "mundillera" artisan Nellie Vera Sánchez was awarded a National Heritage Fellowship Award by the National Endowment for the Arts in honor of her work on this traditional craft.

See also 
 Bobbin lace
 Rosa Elena Egipciaco
 Puerto Rican Art

References

External links 
 Museo Del Mundillo
 LocalLearningNetwork: Meet Rosa Elena Egipciaco
  Encajes: a short documentary about the craft of bobbin-lace making in puerto rico

Lace
Puerto Rican art
Moca, Puerto Rico
Bobbin lace